Granulinella is a genus of minute sea snails, marine gastropod mollusks or micromollusks in the family Granulinidae.

Species
 Granulinella pruinosa (Boyer, 2003) (synonym: Granulina pruinosa Boyer, 2003)

References

 Boyer F. (2017). Révision de l'organisation supra-spécifique des gastéropodes granuliniformes. Xenophora Taxonomy. 16: 25-38

Granulinidae